Peach Creek is an unincorporated community in Brazos County, in the U.S. state of Texas. According to the Handbook of Texas, no population estimates were available for the community in 2000. It is located within the Bryan-College Station metropolitan area.

History
Peach Creek was first settled in the late 1800s and was named for a nearby creek of the same name. The oldest graves in its cemetery date back to the 1870s. Some of the first settlers were surnamed Allen, Marquart, Barker, and Day. Riverside Dancehall served as the community center. There was no population estimate in 2000.

Geography

Education
Peach Creek had a school in the 1900s and closed at the end of the decade. Today, Peach Creek is served by the College Station Independent School District.

References

Unincorporated communities in Brazos County, Texas
Unincorporated communities in Texas